Dior Homme is the menswear division of Christian Dior SA, the French clothing retailer. Dior Men has been under the creative direction of Kim Jones since spring/summer 2019. It had been directed by Hedi Slimane since the fall/winter 2001-02 season. Under Hedi Slimane's direction, Dior Men has introduced a characteristic slim silhouette which has since taken off within the fashion industry. The early collections delved into the exploration of the male sex. The look darkened during the Luster period which was inspired by the electroscene of Berlin. Since 2004 A/W, Dior Men has delved into exploring the different styles of Rock and Roll. The logo currently used by Dior Men is a bee, usually in the bottom right-hand side of knitwear and the top right side in polo shirts.

Since 2007 and the departure of Hedi Slimane, Kris Van Assche implements a more formal and minimal style. Over the seasons, he softens the black stiff silhouette which had become too cliché and opt for models who add an athletic look to the spindly Dior Men silhouette.
This new look is characterized by attention to details and color palette of shades of black, gray, blue or brown.

During the 1980s and 1990s Dior's menswear line was called Dior Monsieur.

In late 2007 Dior Men began producing a six-piece men's skin care range, with Hedi Slimane designing the packaging. The skin care range is available for sale in France and department stores in many other countries.

Since March 2018, the Dior menswear line is called Dior Men instead of Dior Homme. The change was under the influence of creative director Kim Jones.

Collections

Reference codes
When dealing and trading Dior Men, the reference code is often used to place the item within the season it was produced. Here we decipher a typical/standard code: 5EH1015678 E47 B6A8 (SS'05 blue glitter jeans).
 
'5' refers to the year, that is, 2005.
 
'EH' refers to the season, that is, Eté (Summer). HH refers to 'Hiver' (Winter).
 
'101' refers to the item group, in this case, trousers (Pantalon). Other examples: 102 refers to blazers (Veste), 105 to shirts (Chemise) and so forth.
 
The next 4 numbers '5678' should refer to the specific item, with jeans it will reveal the type of cut as the entire 16 digit reference code will only differ by the first 2 digits in this set of 4 numbers for the differing cut. As noted earlier, the # for this item is 5EH1015678 E47 B6A8, referring to the 21 cm cut. The # for the 19 cm variant is 5EH1011678 E47 B6A8.
 
'E47',is the fabric code. 
 
The last 4, 'B6A8', is the colour code. In this particular case, 'B' refers to Bleu (blue), as in indigo blue, the main colour of the jean. 'A' refers to Argent (silver), the colour of the glitter. Another example would be B6N0 - the colour code for the SS'03 released classic blue distressed clawmark jeans painted over in matte black paint. The B6 again refers to the base colour bleu whilst the N0 refers to the black paint ('N' for Noir - black).

See also
 Christian Dior

References

External links
 Dior Homme collections SS02-SS07 (under Hedi Slimane)
 Dior Homme Spring/Summer 2016 Collection

Dior
Clothing companies of France
High fashion brands
Haute couture